Laird Glacier is a tributary glacier,  long, flowing northeast from the Supporters Range, Antarctica, to enter Keltie Glacier  southeast of Ranfurly Point. It was named by the Advisory Committee on Antarctic Names for Robert J. Laird, a United States Antarctic Research Program biologist at McMurdo Station, 1963.

References

Glaciers of Dufek Coast